Gerrit-Engelke-Preis is a literary prize of Hannover, parallel to Kurt-Morawietz-Literaturpreis. Both are replaced by Hölty-Preis.

 1979: Günter Herburger and Günter Wallraff
 1981: Ingeborg Drewitz
 1983: Axel Eggebrecht
 1985: Max von der Grün
 1987: Gisela Elsner
 1989: Friedrich Christian Delius
 1991: Adam Seide
 1993: Helga M. Novak
 1995: Erich Hackl
 1997: Dea Loher
 1999: Kerstin Hensel
 2001: Angela Krauß
 2003: Lothar Baier
 2005: Lukas Bärfuss

German literary awards